The Pigou River is a salmon river in the Côte-Nord region of Quebec, Canada. It empties into the Gulf of Saint Lawrence.

Location

The river flows south through the unorganized territory of Rivière-Nipissis.
The mouth of the Pigou River is in the municipality of Sept-Îles, Sept-Rivières.

Name

The name "Pigou" may come from the Algonquin language pikiou meaning "gum", referring to a place where resin is extracted from fir or pine, or from the Innu language pikiou meaning "fish".
The name is also used for nearby islands and a fishing bank. 
Another theory, less likely, is that "pigou" is an old navy term for a hanging candle holder.
The Pigou River is first mentioned by name in 1892 by the  surveyor C. C. Duberger who wrote that "the Pigou River is small and does not appear to be long".

Description

According to the Dictionnaire des rivières et lacs de la province de Québec (1914),

Basin

It lies between the basins of the Loups Marins River and the Bouleau River.
It covers part of the unorganized territory of Rivière-Nipissis and part of the municipality of Sept-Îles.
The bedrock is Precambrian, covered in typical boreal vegetation.
A map of the ecological regions of Quebec shows the Pigou River in sub-regions 6j-T and 6m-T of the east spruce/moss subdomain.

Salmon

This section has large pools separated by short sections of rapids.
The bed of the river is fine Champlain sediment in parts, bare rock in other parts.
Between 1984 and 2017 there were only two reported catches of salmon in the river, both in 1998.

In May 2015 the Ministry of Forests, Wildlife and Parks of Quebec announced a sport fishing catch-and-release program for large salmon on sixteen of Quebec's 118 salmon rivers.
These were the Mitis, Laval, Pigou, Bouleau, Aux Rochers, Jupitagon, Magpie, Saint-Jean, Corneille, Piashti, Watshishou, Little Watshishou, Nabisipi, Aguanish and Natashquan rivers.
The Quebec Atlantic Salmon Federation said that the measures did not go nearly far enough in protecting salmon for future generations.
In view of the rapidly declining Atlantic salmon population catch-and-release should have been implemented on all rivers apart from northern Quebec.

In 2017 all salmon, large and small, had to be released on the Malbaie (Gaspé Peninsula), Pigou, Bouleau, Magpie, Coacoachou, Nétagamiou, Little Mecatina and Véco rivers. 
Only young salmon could be retained on 51 rivers, and limited retention of large salmon was allowed on 19 rivers.

Notes

Sources

Rivers of Côte-Nord